Harout O. Sanasarian (born March 31, 1929) is former member of the Wisconsin State Assembly.

Biography
Sanasarian was born on March 31, 1929 in Baghdad. He graduated from high school in Milwaukee, Wisconsin before attending the Milwaukee School of Engineering and the University of Wisconsin–Milwaukee. Sanasarian is married with two children.

Career
Sanasarian was first elected to the Assembly in 1968. He is a Democrat. He unsuccessful ran for the democratic nomination for Lieutenant Governor of Wisconsin, he lost with just 6% of the vote.

References

People from Baghdad
Iraqi emigrants to the United States
Politicians from Milwaukee
Democratic Party members of the Wisconsin State Assembly
Milwaukee School of Engineering alumni
University of Wisconsin–Milwaukee alumni
1929 births
Living people